Juguang Township / Jyuguang Township (Foochow Romanized: Gṳ̄-guŏng-hiŏng), also spelled Chukuang, is a rural township of Lienchiang County (the Matsu Islands), Republic of China (Taiwan). Juguang Township includes two major islands, Dongju Island ( "East Ju"; Dĕ̤ng-gṳ̄) and Xiju Island ( "West Ju"; Să̤-gṳ̄), as well as some islets.

Name
On October 15, 1971, the Executive Yuan approved changing the name of the township from Baiquan Township (Paichuan, White Dogs) to Juguang Township (Chukuang). They also approved changing the name of Xiquan Island (Hsichuan) to Xiju Island (Hsiju) and Dongquan Island (Tungchuan) to Dongju Island (Tungchu). The islands were renamed based on a quote of a speech by Chiang Kai-shek, "forget not that you're in Ju" (Wú wàng zài Jǔ; Ù uông câi Gṳ̄). It refers to the City of Ju, where the king of Qi prepared a counterattack that retook his country from the State of Yan. This is an analogy of Matsu and Taiwan generally as bases of the Republic of China (ROC) to regenerate itself and one day recover mainland China from the Chinese Communist Party.

Dongju and Xiju Islands were previously named Dongquan (Tung-ch'üan Tao/Tung-ch'uan Tao ; Dĕ̤ng-kēng) and Xiquan (Hsi-ch'üan Tao/Hsi-ch'uan Tao ; Să̤-kēng) Islands, meaning "Eastern Dog" and "Western Dog" respectively. They have also been called the White Dogs (Paichuan, Baiquan) or White Dog Islands (Băh-kēng-dō̤) or Baiken Islands (白肯島). The name Baiquan (白犬) has been connected with the homophonous name Baiquan (白畎).

History
On May 15, 1617, sixty-nine wokou were captured alive in the area.

In 1872, construction of Dongsha (Tungsha) Lighthouse (Dongquan Lighthouse) began.

In December 1939, Japanese naval forces from Taiwan occupied the islands.

The islands were originally part of the Changle County before the ROC government evacuated to Taiwan. It is considered by the People's Republic of China government as part of Changle City of the Fuzhou City.

In September 1953, the Changlo County government was established on the islands.

Western Enterprises (西方公司), a CIA front organization, had a communications base on Xiquan (Hsichuan).

After a series of combat readiness tests carried out by MAAG were completed on April 15, 1955, the overall Chinese Nationalist defense preparations for the Matsu Islands were rated as satisfactory. One of the weaknesses noted was "the seriously understrength regiment garrisoning the Paichuan (White Dog) Islands group".

In July 1956, the islands were transferred to Lienchiang County. The islands were divided into two townships: Xiquan and Dongquan.

On August 19, 1958, President Chiang Kai-shek visited Xiju Island (then Xiquan) and spoke to the soldiers there.

In September 1960, the two townships were united into one, Paichuan (Baiquan) township.

On July 23, 1964, Chiang Ching-kuo visited the islands.

On October 15, 1971, the Executive Yuan approved changing the name of the township from Baiquan Township (Paichuan, White Dogs) to Juguang Township (Chukuang). They also approved changing the name of Xiquan Island (Hsichuan) to Xiju Island (Hsiju) and Dongquan Island (Tungchuan) to Dongju Island (Tungchu).

On September 21, 1979, and on May 3, 1980, President Chiang Ching-kuo visited the township.

On June 18, 1993, President Lee Teng-hui visited the Dongju Elementary School.

On June 24, 2001, Typhoon Chebi caused 3,000,000 yuan of damage on the islands.

In the 2018 election, Mayor Hsieh Chun-Lan was re-elected mayor, defeating her opponent Chen Shun-Shou by over a hundred votes. Hsieh called for rebuilding the former township office as a resort, beautification of the township, and creation of a vibrant sight-seeing economy.

Geography

Dongju (Tong Chu), the southernmost of the Matsu Islands, is 2.63 km2 and Sijyu 2.36 km2. Islets includes like Yongliu (永留嶼 Yongliu) near Dongju. Dongju is shaped like a dagger, while Xiju a triangle, so seemingly bigger on maps. Some cliffs of Dongjyu is severely corroded by wind, creating a strangely aesthetic appearance. Other islands include Linaoyu also known as Lintouyu, Xiniuyu, Dayu, Xiaoyu, and Sheshan. The northernmost and easternmost points of Juguang Township are on Dayu, the westernmost point is on Sheshan, and the southernmost point is on Linaoyu. Linaoyu is also the southernmost point of the Matsu Islands.

Juguang is across from Meihua Town, Changle District, Fuzhou, Fujian, China (PRC).

Politics and government

Administrative divisions

Administratively the islands are part of the Lienchiang County. Neither Dongju nor Xiju has an island-wide administrative level. The islands are divided into five rural villages:

Xiju Island 
 Qingfan Village ( Qīngfán) 
 Xiqiu Village ( Xīqīu) 
 Tianwo Village ( Tiánwò)

Dongju Island 
 Daping Village ( Dàpíng) 
 Fuzheng Village ( Fúzhèng)

Mayors
 Appointed mayors:
 Chen Chia-Tui (1960-1961)
 Lin Tso-Chou (1961-1964)
 Hsueh Chih-Lien (1964-1967), former mayor of Nangan
 Li Kuei-Li (1967-1970), later mayor of Beigan
 Chen I-Peng (1970-1973), mayor during the change of the name of the township and islands, former mayor of Beigan and later mayor of Nangan (Matsu)
 Lin Po-Jen (1973-1978)
 Elected mayors:
 Lin Mao-Chun (1978-1982), received 692 votes out of a total 697 votes cast (699 eligible voters)
 Chen Chien-Kuang (1982-1986)
 Chen Le-Tuan (1986-1990)
 Tsao Erh-Szu (1990-1994)
 Wang Ta-Chieh (1994-1998)
 Chiang Chih-Hsing (1998-2002)
 Wang Ta-Chieh (2002-2006), second term
 Ko Yu-Kuan (2006-2014)
 Hsieh Chun-Lan (2014–present) (KMT), b.1960 first female mayor of the township

Infrastructure

Electricity supply

The township is powered up by Xiju Power Plant located in Xiju Island and Dongju Power Plant located in Dongju Island. Due to the changes in electricity needs, both islands were interconnected by submarine power cable since 2000.

Water supply

Previously, water supply had been scarce in Xiju Island despite having water wells drilled around the island by the residents. Later the military built a dam and formed the Ledaoao Reservoir for the water needs of residents, defense and irrigation.

Tourism

The 19.5-metre (54-step) Dongquan Lighthouse on northern Dongjyu, made during the late Qing dynasty with granite. The guiding light is in the shape of a clam and can reach . Dongju Lighthouse is a second-level national historic building. In front of the lighthouse, there used to be four mist-cannon for signaling, but has now been removed and placed in Matsu Folk Culture Museum.

The 42-character Dapu Inscription, in Dapu Seaport of Dongju, was made during the Wanli era of the Ming dynasty, concerning the capture of pirates alive. Remembering-the-Past Pavilion (懷古亭 Huaigu Ting) was constructed in 1966 sheltering the stone.

In the sea south of the Sijyu, there is Snake Mountain (蛇山). The main island has a small Green-sail Seaport (青帆港), two water reservoirs and a middle-elementary school, but are not major tourist attractions.

It also features the Mysterious Little Bay.

Transportation

There is one accessible seaport on Xiju, and two on Dongju. Juguang can be reached by ferry from Fuao Harbor in Nangan or by helicopter which only operates during the winter and priority on which is given to local residents.

Notable natives
 Chen Hsueh-sheng, Magistrate of Lienchiang County (2001-2009)

See also
 Administrative divisions of the Republic of China
 List of islands of the Republic of China
 List of islands in the East China Sea

References

External links
 
 軍史探舊系列－莒光前線行(上集) ('Exploring Military History Series - A Visit to the Frontline at Juguang (Part One)')